Be as One is the second album released by melody. 「CD＋DVD」version is Limited edition．

Track listing

CD

 Be as One (4:13)
 See You... (4:24)
 De ja Vu (3:22)
 Realize (3:48)
 Close Your Eyes: English Version (5:19)
 Promises (3:40)
 Dear Love (2:46)
 Take a Chance (4:23)
 Next to You (4:35)
 Stay with Me (4:48)
 Gift of Love (4:56)
 Miss You: Nagareboshi Remix (M-Flo Loves Melody. & Yamamoto Ryohei) (5:38)

DVD
Music clip & TV-CM
 Next to You
 Realize
 See You...
making of "See You..."

Melody (Japanese singer) albums
2006 albums